Lisa Thomaidis is a Canadian basketball coach who is the head coach of the Saskatchewan Huskies women's basketball program, winning the Bronze Baby National Championship Trophy in 2016 and 2020.  She was also the head coach for the Canada women's national basketball team from 2014 to September, 2021.

Early life and education
Thomaidis went to McMaster University to study kinesiology and joined the university's women's basketball team. After moving to Greece and play for Apollon Ptolemaidas, an injury ended her basketball career and led her to coaching.

Career
Starting in 1998, Thomaidis began coaching women's basketball at the University of Saskatchewan. Throughout her career as coach for the Saskatchewan Huskies, she led the team to multiple Canada West titles, with their first championship win in 2006. Outside the University of Saskatchewan, Thomaidis was an assistant coach for Canada women's national basketball team from 2002 to 2013, which included a quarter final performance at the 2012 Summer Olympics.

Head coach
In 2013, she replaced Allison McNeill as head coach and her team won silver at the 2013 FIBA Americas Championship for Women. Following her promotion, Thomaidis led Canada's women's basketball team to a fifth-place finish at the 2014 FIBA World Championship for Women and a gold medal at the 2015 Pan American Games. Recently, Thomaidis's team came in seventh at the 2016 Summer Olympics and won a gold medal at the 2017 FIBA Women's AmeriCup.

Awards and honours
During her university basketball coaching career, Thomaidis has been named coach of the year multiple times by Canadian Interuniversity Sport and Canada West.
In 2006, Thomaidis was inducted into the McMaster Athletics Hall of Fame. Thomaidis was also named best coach of 2015 at the Petro-Canada Sport Leadership Awards and the Saskatchewan Sports Awards.

Canada West Coach of the Year - 2004, 2006, 2009, 2011 and 2016
Colb McEwon Trophy: 2006, 2009, 2011, 2016, 2020 (Saskatchewan Huskies Athletics Coach of the Year) - Lisa Thomaidis
2008-09 Canadian Interuniversity Sport Coach of the Year 
2010-11 Canadian Interuniversity Sport Coach of the Year 
2016 CAAWS Women of Influence Award

Personal life
Her father Christos was born at Mesochori in Florina, Greece.

References

Living people
Canadian women's basketball coaches
1972 births
Canadian people of Greek descent
Olympic coaches